Kerria is a genus of scale insect of the family Kerriidae. The species are found throughout southeast Asia, India and southern China.

Species list
Subgenus Kerria (Chamberliniella)
 
 
 
 

Subgenus Kerria (Kerria)

References

External links

Hemiptera of Asia
Kerriidae